Wasps FC is an amateur rugby union club formed in 1867. The men's first team was split from Wasps FC at the turn of professionalism, for the 1996-97 season, to become Wasps RFC, who currently play at the Coventry Building Society Arena in Coventry.  The  men's team currently plays rugby in the Herts/Middlesex 1 league. Wasps Women compete in the Premier 15s, the highest women's league in the country, the ladies section has been established since 1984 and have consistently been a top 7 team in the country. Wasps Women have attracted elite athletes from around the world including England international Danielle Waterman and global brand sponsors. Wasps FC owns the Twyford Avenue Sports Ground that was also used by the Wasps professional teams for training until the end of the 2015–16 season.

Wasps FC retains close links with their professional brothers and still owns approximately 5% of Wasps RFC.

The youth section has several championship sides and the minis compete actively at the higher levels.

Ladies 2019–20 season
Wasps FC Ladies gained sponsorship from global brand Vodafone UK alongside Wasps RFC and Wasps Netball, bringing together the entire Wasps brand.

Ladies 2018–19 season
The 1st XV placed 4th in the league and were beaten by Saracens Women in the Premier 15s semi final. The 2nd XV won all but 2 games during the entire season and finished 2nd in the Development League.

Men 2018–19 season
The first team finished 6th in the Herts & Middlesex 1 league.

Ladies 2017–18 season
The 1st XV placed 3rd in the league and were beaten by Harlequins in the Premier 15s double-legged semi final. The 2nd XV won all but 2 games during the entire season and finished 2nd in the Development League.

Men 2017–18 season
The first team finished 6th in the Herts & Middlesex 1 league.

Men 2014–15 season
The first team finished tenth in their league, and the second team was relegated to the third (of 6) divisions in the Middlesex Merit Table for 2015-16.

Men 2013–14 season
The first team finished fourth in their league, and the second team remained in the second (of 6) divisions in the Middlesex Merit Table for 2014-15. The third team, "The Fat Dads" (though not many are fat), continued to play friendlies and were inaugural members of the Middlesex Social League.

Men 2012–13 season
In 2012-13 the first XV finished  mid-table in London 3 North West. The second XV finished 3rd in Middlesex Merit Table 3 and was promoted into Middlesex Merit Table 2.

Men 2011–12 season
In 2011-12 the first XV had a record-breaking season, winning all 18 games in Herts & Middlesex 1 to gain promotion to London 3 North West. Highlights included doing the double over both Hackney RFC and Old Priorians RFC, the closest challengers for the title.

Men 2010–11 season
In 2010-11 the first XV was relegated from London 3 North West back to Herts & Middlesex 1. The second XV competed in Middlesex Merit Table 4 league.

Men 2009–10 season
The 2009-10 season was a very successful one for Wasps FC. Fielding two senior men's sides, the first XV won promotion from Herts & Middlesex 1 into London 3 North West and the second XV won the Middlesex Merit Table 5 League, gaining promotion into the Middlesex Merit Table 4 league in the process. On the back of these successes it was announced the club would once again be fielding a third XV for the 2010-11 season.

Club Honours
Middlesex 7s winners (4): 1948, 1952, 1985, 1993
Middlesex Senior Cup winners (8): 1974, 1975, 1977, 1978, 1979, 1982, 1984, 1987
Herts/Middlesex 3 South champions (2): 2000–01, 2001–02
Herts/Middlesex 1 champions (2): 2009–10, 2011–12

References

External links
Official Wasps Football Club Website
Wasps rugby club - Professional side
Wasps FC/Wasps supporters website
 Wasps FC ground (Twyford Avenue) at Google Maps

Wasps RFC
English rugby union teams
Rugby union clubs in London
Rugby clubs established in 1867